George Owen (18 August 1893 – 1 June 1966) was a British cyclist. He competed in the sprint event at the 1924 Summer Olympics.

References

External links
 

1893 births
1966 deaths
British male cyclists
Olympic cyclists of Great Britain
Cyclists at the 1924 Summer Olympics
Place of birth missing